Magheru may refer to several entities in Romania:

Gheorghe Magheru, revolutionary
Bulevardul Magheru, street in Bucharest
George Magheru, poet and playwright, grandson of Gheorghe
Darie Magheru, poet and theatre actor
Magheru, a village in Breznița-Ocol Commune, Mehedinți County

Romanian-language surnames